Sky 3D was a television channel of Sky Deutschland that lasted from 2010 to 2017. It only broadcast 3D content.

History
Sky 3D launched on 13 October 2010 via Astra 19.2°E and cable operator Kabel BW in regular operation, prior to a test broadcast. The transmitter was free for all customers for 3 months. Since then, the was made available free of charge. The broadcasting time was usually between 11 and midnight, while in the broadcast-free time, trailers were shown. From summer 2013, a one-time activation fee of €29.90 was required to access the channel. Sky 3D was discontinued on 1 July 2017 due to its low ratings.

References

External links
 

Defunct television channels in Germany
Sky 3D
Sky Deutschland
Sky television channels
German-language television stations
Television channels and stations established in 2010
Television channels and stations disestablished in 2017
2010 establishments in Germany
2017 disestablishments in Germany